James Weston Miller (1815-1888) was an American Presbyterian minister, educator and Confederate chaplain in Texas during the American Civil War. He helped establish the First Presbyterian church in Houston and many Baptist and Methodist churches and schools for blacks. He also taught many daughters of the Southern aristocracy at the Live Oak Female Seminary in Gay Hill, Texas.

Biography

Early life
James Weston Miller was born on November 15, 1815 in Erie County, Pennsylvania. His father was Jeremiah Miller and his mother, Elizabeth (Weston) Miller. He had eight siblings. His family was Methodist.

He graduated from Waterford Academy in 1835 and graduated from Jefferson College in Canonsburg, Pennsylvania in 1840. He then graduated from the Presbyterian Western Theological Seminary in Allegheny, Pennsylvania.

Career
He served as assistant to Matthew Brown, the President of Jefferson College, his alma mater, in 1841. He then became a Principal at the Grove Academy in Steubenville, Ohio, where he became friends with Dr Charles Clinton Beatty, the President of Steubenville Female Seminary, until 1843.

He moved to Houston, Texas in 1844. He gave sermons in the Texas Capitol, sometimes attended by Sam Houston, the President of the Texas Republic. A year later, in 1845, he oversaw the construction of the First Presbyterian Church of Houston. He served as Presbyterian minister there from 1847. Theologically, he believed that salvation was for the living, and that one could not repent just before death. He also became a delegate to the Presbyterian General Assembly that same year. He was a member of the Texas Literary Institute. In 1849, he helped decide on Huntsville, Texas as the location of the Presbyterian Texas College. He also helped charter Austin College in Austin, Texas, where he served on the Board of Trustees from 1849 to 1878.

In 1850, he moved to Gay Hill, Washington County, Texas, a small town home to the Mount Prospect Presbyterian Church, where he served as Presbyterian minister for one year. The church was the second oldest Presbyterian church in Texas, having been established by Hugh Wilson in 1839. The following year, in 1851, he became the first clerk of the Synod of Texas in Austin, Texas. From 1851 to 1861, he was a pastor in Washington-on-the-Brazos. Meanwhile, he established the (now defunct) Live Oak Female Seminary in Gay Hill, where he taught many daughters of the Southern aristocracy.

He was a minister to many blacks, included those on the Glenblythe Plantation owned by Thomas Affleck in Gay Hill. During the American Civil War of 1861-1865, he served as a Confederate chaplain under Brigadier General Thomas Neville Waul. Shortly after the war, he helped establish many Baptist and Methodist churches, cemeteries and schools for blacks.

He taught at the Post Oak Academy from 1865 to 1867. He then resumed his ministry in Washington-on-the-Brazos up until 1876.  From 1877 to 1880, he was a pastor in Galatia, Texas. He also served as minister in Round Top, Brenham, and Chapel Hill. In 1881, he joined the Board of Trustees of the Stuart Academy in Austin, founded by his sister-in-law, Rebecca Stuart.

He made mustang wine every fall.

Personal life
He married Elizabeth McKennan in 1847. They had two sons. She died in 1850, he got remarried to Elizabeth Scott Stuart, his first cousin, in 1852. They had two sons and three daughters.

Death
He died on April 29, 1888 in Gay Hill, Texas.

Legacy
His private residence, Oak Lodge, also known as "the old Miller Home," was dedicated as a library-museum in 1933.

References

1815 births
1888 deaths
People from Erie County, Pennsylvania
Military personnel from Houston
People from Washington County, Texas
American Presbyterian ministers
Northern-born Confederates
Austin College
Confederate States Army chaplains
People from Washington-on-the-Brazos, Texas
19th-century American clergy
Military personnel from Pennsylvania